Rafael Godoy Lozano (24 October 1907 – 14 March 1973) was a well-known Colombian composer born in Natagaima, Tolima.

Biography 
From a young age, he was linked to the trade-union movement in Barrancabermeja, Santander, from where he had to emigrate when his personal security was threatened. He fled to Venezuela, where he developed his musical career and composed what are often taken to be his best musical pieces.

His most widely known, and possibly best song, is the bambuco "Soy colombiano" (I'm Colombian); he composed many other less-known bambucos and andean music songs, such as "Arrunchaditos", "Pasito", "Mi cafetal", "Canto a Colombia", "Tierra caliente" and many others.

Many versions of "Soy colombiano" have appeared since it was composed, even a vallenato version by Lisandro Meza, although the most popular version is the one from the Tolimense folk music duet Garzón y Collazos.

Rafael Godoy died in Caracas, Venezuela, on March 14, 1973 at the age of 65.

References

External links
a brief history of Godoy's life and works (in Spanish)

Colombian musicians
Bambuco musicians
1907 births
1973 deaths
Andean music
Death in Caracas